Nikko Seagal Natividad (born February 13, 1993) is a Filipino model, actor and dancer, who became popular after winning ABS-CBN's noontime variety show It's Showtime's Gandang Lalake segment. He is also known as one of the members of #Hashtags of the same noontime variety show.

In July 2016 he was selected as one of the housemates of the 7th season of Pinoy Big Brother as a 2-in-1 housemate with McCoy de Leon. Inside the house, he admitted being a father to a child out of marriage. He was also chosen to be the Most Valuable Housemate in his stay at the house. They were hailed as the 6th Lucky Big Placer.

Early life

Nikko was born and raised in the city of Malolos in the province of Bulacan. He was a waiter who tried his luck joining the Gandang Lalake, Kumakareer segment of It's Showtime. Luckily, he won the said competition as the Grand Winner. After such, he appeared on several TV shows of ABS-CBN. He then joined the famous boy group in the Philippines, the '#Hashtags'.

Filmography

Television

Film

Music
#Hashtags released their first self-titled album on May 21, 2016. The album contains six tracks with their carrier single 'Roadtrip'.

References

External links
 

1993 births
Living people
Filipino male dancers
21st-century Filipino male singers
Filipino television personalities
Male actors from Bulacan
People from Bulacan
People from Malolos
ABS-CBN personalities
Pinoy Big Brother contestants
Star Magic
Viva Artists Agency
Tagalog people
21st-century Filipino male actors